Adelelm may refer to:

Adelelm of Jumièges (died 1083), abbot of Abingdon
Adelelm (Dean of Lincoln) (died 1179), Lord High Treasurer of England and Archdeacon of Dorset

See also
Adelelmus

Masculine given names